This article is a list of diseases of mustard (Brassica juncea var. crispifolia and B. nigra).

Bacterial diseases

Fungal diseases

Miscellaneous diseases and disorders

Nematodes, parasitic

Viral diseases

References
Common Names of Diseases, The American Phytopathological Society

Mustard
Canola diseases